Cleyton Campos de Melo (born 2 January 1984) is a Brazilian footballer who plays as a forward for Rio Branco. In 2012 he had his only experience outside Brazil playing in Romania for Liga I club Universitatea Cluj.

Honours
Portuguesa
Campeonato Brasileiro Série B: 2011

References

External links

1984 births
Living people
Brazilian footballers
Association football forwards
Campeonato Brasileiro Série B players
Campeonato Brasileiro Série C players
Campeonato Brasileiro Série D players
Liga I players
Rio Branco Atlético Clube players
Boa Esporte Clube players
Ypiranga Futebol Clube players
Associação Portuguesa de Desportos players
FC Universitatea Cluj players
Guaratinguetá Futebol players
Clube Esportivo Aimoré players
Guarany Sporting Club players
Clube Esportivo Lajeadense players
Brazilian expatriate footballers
Expatriate footballers in Romania
Brazilian expatriate sportspeople in Romania